Stigmella hoheriae is a species of moth of the family Nepticulidae. This day flying moth is found in New Zealand where it is rarely noticed as the species is very small and as a result does not tend to attract attention when on the wing.

Description

The wingspan of an adult moth of this species is 6–8 mm.

Distribution
This species is endemic to New Zealand. S. hoheriae is very common throughout New Zealand.

Life history 
The females lay eggs on the surface of a still growing leaf of their host plant. Larva have been recorded from February to August and are 2–3 mm long and pale transparent green. They mine the leaves of their host plant. The mine consists of blotches, mainly on the lower leaves. The mine is narrow and crosses over itself several times, but rarely passes larger leaf ribs. The frass is deposited in a straight, granular line medially in the mine. The cocoon is spun from dark brown silk (from larvae found on Hoheria lyalli and H. glabrata) οr pale whitish silk (larvae on other Hoheria species). It is located amongst the debris at the base of the food plant. Adults are mainly on the wing from August to November. However adult moths have been recorded in February and from July to December indicating there are likely two generations per year.

Habitat and host species
This species prefers native forest habitat. The larvae feed on Hoheria species such as Hoheria glabrata, Hoheria populnea, Hoheria sexstylosa and Hoheria angustifolia.

References

Nepticulidae
Moths of New Zealand
Endemic fauna of New Zealand
Moths described in 1989
Endemic moths of New Zealand